Margaret Armstrong may refer to:

Margaret Neilson Armstrong (1867–1944), American author, designer and illustrator
Margaret Armstrong, see Ottawa South (provincial electoral district)
Margaret Armstrong (actress) in Annie Oakley (1935 film)
Margaret Armstrong (geostatistician)

See also
Peggy Armstrong (disambiguation)